Frederick Alan Hough (born 23 December 1935) is an English former footballer who played on the right-wing for Port Vale in the 1950s.

Career
Hough joined Port Vale in June 1955 and made his debut at Vale Park in a 1–0 loss to Coventry City on Boxing Day of 1957. He played three further Third Division South games that season before "Valiants" manager Norman Low handed him a free transfer in May 1958.

Career statistics
Source:

References

1935 births
Living people
Footballers from Stoke-on-Trent
English footballers
Association football wingers
Port Vale F.C. players
English Football League players